Saburro Peak is a peak in Antarctica to the south of Doll Peak in the south part of Ravens Mountains, Britannia Range. Named after Colonel Richard M.Saburro, Commander, Operation DEEP FREEZE  who was assigned to this position from the 109 AG of the New York Air National Guard. Saburro was the first US Air Force Commander of Operation DEEP FREEZE following 45 years of command by the US Navy. The Operation provides military logistics support to the National Science Foundation's US Antarctic Program.

Mountains of Oates Land